Intimate Sketches (Intimní skici) is a collection of piano miniatures by Czech composer Leoš Janáček (1854–1928) published in 1994, sixty-six years after his death.

The music

The thirteen pieces in the set, each only a minute or two long, were gathered from manuscripts and ephemeral publications, notably the People's News (Lidové noviny). Nos. 5, 6, 7, and 8 here are Nos. 3, 5, 12, and 13 respectively in the Album for Kamila Stösslová (Památník pro Kamilu Stösslovou).

Recordings

Håkon Austbø plays eleven of the pieces on his Janáček: Piano Works (Complete) (Brilliant Classics, 2005). Thomas Adès plays six of them on his recording of The Diary of One Who Disappeared with Ian Bostridge (EMI, 2001). Sarah Lavaud has recorded 5 of the pieces on a CD published by Hortus.  has recorded all pieces except the 'Rondo' (a juvenile work) on his 3-CD Janacek compilation (HOFA, 2013).

Related scores

Intimate Sketches was followed by a second volume of twenty-six miniatures called Moravian Dances (Moravské tance).

References

Compositions by Leoš Janáček